Seppo Mikkola (born 1947) is a Finnish astronomer. He is a senior lecturer at the University of Turku and staff member at Tuorla Observatory.

Mikkola is a leading expert in celestial mechanics. He has made fundamental contributions to the theory of regularization of motion in the gravitational N-body problem. Mikkola was a member of the team that determined the unusual orbit of 3753 Cruithne.

Named after him
 Asteroid 3381 Mikkola

References

External links
 Seppo Mikkola's home page

21st-century astronomers
Finnish astronomers
Living people
1947 births